Jelloway is an unincorporated community in Jefferson Township, Knox County, Ohio, United States.

History
Jelloway was originally called Brownsville, and under the latter name was laid out in 1840. The present name comes from nearby Jelloway Creek. A post office called Jelloway was established in 1842, and remained in operation until 1918.

References

External links

Unincorporated communities in Knox County, Ohio
1840 establishments in Ohio
Populated places established in 1840
Unincorporated communities in Ohio